Max Foorman Gruenberg, Jr. (September 25, 1943 – February 14, 2016) was an American politician, a Democratic member of the Alaska House of Representatives, representing the 14th District since 2003. He previously served from 1985 through 1993.  On October 13, 2009, he became the senior member of the House following the death of Richard Foster of Nome.

Gruenberg served in the United States Navy during the Vietnam War. He died on February 14, 2016, at his home in Juneau after spending an evening with his wife and friends. He was 72 years old.

Life and education 
Max F. Gruenberg Jr. was born in San Francisco, California to Dorothy Lilienthal Gruenberg and Max Gruenberg, Sr. in 1943 as their only son. Growing up, Gruenberg participated in Boy Scouts and achieved Eagle Scout level. He graduated from Acalanes High School, located in Lafayette, California in 1961 and continued onto Stanford University from 1961-1965, where he earned his B.A. in Political Science. After Gruenberg graduated from Stanford University, he spent three more years, from 1967-1970, at UCLA Law School. On June 5, 1994, Gruenberg married his third wife, Kayla Epstein. Gruenberg had two sons named Bruce and Daniel. Outside of politics, Gruenberg participated in and was a member of the Fairview Lions Club from 1978 to 2016, Alaska Common Ground from 2001 to 2016, a board member in the American Academy of Matrimonial Lawyers from 1981 to 2016, and the Veterans of Foreign Wars from 1993 to 2016. He was also a Family Lawyer from 1974 to 2005, participating in court cases such as Flores v. Flores in 1979 and Hilliker v. Hilliker in 1988, appearing before the Supreme Court of Alaska.

Military career 
Both Gruenberg and his father served in different branches within the United States military. While Gruenberg served in the Navy during the Vietnam War, his father served in the Army during World War II. Gruenberg's mother got remarried to Jacques Schnier, an artist who also served in World War II. After graduating from Stanford University, Gruenberg joined the Navy from 1966-1967 as a lieutenant on a transport ship called the U.S.S. Whitfield, where he was awarded a 3 battle stars Vietnam Service Medal.

Political career 
In 1970, Gruenberg moved to Alaska and began his political life as an Alaskan politician. In 1985, Gruenberg served in the House of Representative, representing East Anchorage House District 16. He remained in office until 1993, when he took a 10 year break from politics. He returned to politics in 2002 and in 2003, where he served as House of Representative until his death in 2016. During Gruenberg's early years in politics, he helped create the Alaska Law Review and worked alongside Republican Senator Ted Stevens as Steven's top legislative aide in Washington D.C. In 1970-1971, Gruenberg was also a Law Clerk for Justice Roger Connor in the Alaska Supreme Court.

Elections for Alaska House of Representatives

Alaska committees

Legislative bills

References

External links
 Alaska State Legislature – Representative Max Gruenberg official government website
 Project Vote Smart – Representative Max F. Gruenberg Jr. (AK) profile
 Follow the Money – Max F Gruenberg Jr
 2006 2004 2002 1994 1992 1990 campaign contributions
 Alaska's Democratic Caucus – Max Gruenberg profile
 Max Gruenberg at 100 Years of Alaska's Legislature

1943 births
2016 deaths
20th-century American politicians
21st-century American politicians
Alaska lawyers
Jewish American state legislators in Alaska
Democratic Party members of the Alaska House of Representatives
Politicians from Anchorage, Alaska
Politicians from San Francisco
Stanford University alumni
UCLA School of Law alumni
United States Navy sailors
Lawyers from Anchorage, Alaska
20th-century American lawyers
21st-century American Jews